The Lake Oswego School District (7J) is a public school district serving Lake Oswego, Oregon, United States, a suburb 10 miles south of Portland. The district comprises 10 primary and secondary schools with a total enrollment of 6,845 as of 2021.

History
Lakewood School was built in 1928. The school closed in 1979 and the Lakewood Center for the Arts began leasing the building in 1980. The center made its final payment to purchase the building from the school district in 1987.

In 2011, the school board approved the closure of three elementary schools as a cost-saving measure. Palisades Elementary was closed in 2012 and Bryant and Uplands Elementary Schools were closed in 2013. It was estimated that the closures would save the district about $2.3 million a year. After the plan was completed, the former Bryant Elementary building became a part of Lakeridge Junior High School and the district's junior high schools switched to sixth through eighth grade. Sixth grade was previously part of the elementary schools. In 2015, a majority of the former Palisades Elementary building was leased to the Lake Oswego Parks and Recreation Department.

Racist incidents 
The Oregonian reported in March 2018 that LOSD schools have faced numerous racist incidents over many years. Students from Lake Oswego Junior High School walked out in protest in February 2018, because following a racist note passing incident. They were frustrated, because this was not the first racist incident.

Demographics
In the 2016-2017 school year, 52.0% of the students were male and 48.0% were female. 75.0% were White, 9.9% Asian, 7.4% Multiracial, 6.4% Hispanic/Latino, 0.8% Black/African American, 0.3% Native Hawaiian/Pacific Islander, and 0.2% American Indian/Alaska Native.

School Board 
There are five school board members, each serving four-year terms. Additionally, there are two non-voting student representatives sitting on the board.

Schools

High schools
Lake Oswego High School
Lakeridge High School

Middle schools
Lake Oswego Junior High School
Lakeridge Middle School

Elementary schools
Forest Hills Elementary
Hallinan Elementary
Lake Grove Elementary
Oak Creek Elementary
River Grove Elementary
Westridge Elementary
Palisades World Language School

Charter school
Harmony Academy (grades 9–12)

References

External links
Lake Oswego School District (official website)

School districts in Oregon
Lake Oswego, Oregon
Education in Washington County, Oregon
Education in Multnomah County, Oregon
Education in Clackamas County, Oregon